Qaleh-ye Sorkh (also Romanized as Qal‘eh-ye Sorkh and Qal‘eh Sorkh; also known as Qal‘a Surkh and Qal‘eh Surkh) is a village in Bala Jam Rural District, Nasrabad District, Torbat-e Jam County, Razavi Khorasan Province, Iran. At the 2006 census, its population was 1,344, in 316 families.

References 

Populated places in Torbat-e Jam County